The Crested is a breed of domestic duck. It was probably brought to Europe from the East Indies by Dutch ships. It has its appearance because it is heterozygous for a genetic mutation causing a deformity of the skull.

History

The Crested probably originates in the East Indies, with subsequent development in Holland. Crested ducks are seen in seventeenth-century paintings such as those of Melchior d'Hondecoeter and Jan Steen. 

In the United States the breed was described by D.J. Browne in 1853. The white Crested was added to the American Standard of Perfection in 1874; the black variant was added in 1977. The Crested was recognised in the United Kingdom in 1910.

A bantam version of the breed, the Crested Miniature, was bred by John Hall and Roy Sutcliffe in the United Kingdom in the late twentieth century; it was recognised in 1997.

Characteristics 

Apart from the crest, the Crested is an ordinary-looking duck of medium size. It may be of any colour, although in the United States only black and white are recognised; in the UK, as in several other European countries, any colour is permitted. They have long, slightly arched necks, medium length body, much depth and fullness through the breast.

Though Cresteds can be good layers and have strong roasting qualities, the main interest and demand for the breed is as pets and decorations. They are not a popular show breed due to challenges associated with the crest genes also causing a fat body within the skull. Depending on the fat body's size and relative position to the brain, it can impede a duck's ability to ambulate. Many crested ducks experience a "tottering" walking pattern and, if knocked over, are unable to get up. Other issues caused by the fat body may include seizures, neurological problems, and even early death.

References

Duck breeds
Animal breeds on the RBST Watchlist